Moodfood is a 1992 album by Moodswings. This album prominently features Chrissie Hynde of The Pretenders on most of the lead vocals.

Track listing
All tracks by J.F.T. Hood and Showbiz except where noted.

 "Throw off the Shackles" – 6:19
 "Moodswings Overture" – 5:56
 "Problem Solved" – 8:11
 "Skinthieves" – 6:08
 "Rainsong" (Chrissie Hynde, Waterhouse) – 6:29
 "100% Total Success" – 3:51
 "Microcosmic" – 4:40
 "Spiritual High (Part I)" (Hood, Jon & Vangelis, Grant Showbiz) – 5:23
 "Spiritual High (State of Independence) Part II" (Hood, Jon & Vangelis, Grant Showbiz) – 4:57
 "Spiritual High (Part III)" (Hood, Jon & Vangelis, Grant Showbiz) – 5:14
 "Thailand" – 7:37
 "Hairy Piano" (Hood, Upchurch ) – 8:27

Personnel

Moodswings
 J.F.T. Hood – drums, producer
 Showbiz – producer, keyboards
 Chrissie Hynde – lead vocals, producer

Additional musicians
 Jeff Beck – guitar
 Kid Prince Moore – vocals
 Linda Muriel – vocals on "Rainsong"
 Terry Disley – string arrangements
 Liz Upchurch – piano
 Amanda Vincent – piano
 Johnny Marr – engineer, additional guitars
 Step Parikian – engineer
 Martin Hawkes – engineer
 Erick Labson – engineer, editing, mixing, post-production
 Mental Block – design, illustrations
 Peter Mountain – photography
 Rob Williams – photography

Charts

Notes
 "Skinthieves" features a guitar solo performed by Jeff Beck, and was used as the theme for the TV series America's Most Wanted.
 "Spiritual High" is based on the Jon & Vangelis song "State of Independence" and features vocals by Chrissie Hynde. Part III incorporates excerpts from Martin Luther King Jr.'s "I Have a Dream" speech. Part II was featured in the film Single White Female. "Spiritual High" reached #6 on Billboards Modern Rock Tracks chart.

References

Moodswings (band) albums
1992 albums